Eyal Shani is an Israeli chef noted for creating the Miznon restaurant chain.

Culinary career
Shani, a self-taught chef, opened the Israeli fine dining restaurant, Ocean, in 1989. After closing Ocean, he spent several years as a restaurant consultant.

Shani opened the first restaurant in his contemporary casual chain, Miznon, in 2011.  It has since expanded to an international chain with restaurants in Paris, Vienna, Melbourne,  and New York.

Shani's signature dishes at Miznon include whole, roasted cauliflower,  and “run over potato”, a baked potato mixed with garlic, green onions, and sour cream and served paper-thin.

Shani opened HaSalon in Tel Aviv and Givatayim in 2008. Eyal is the head chef at the restaurant, which opens only two nights a week.  Richard Vines, restaurant reviewer for Bloomberg, described the food at HaSalon as "simple but epic." Gault Millau named it one of the top restaurants in Israel in 2018.

In April 2019, Shani and longtime business partner Shachar Segal opened HaSalon in Hell's Kitchen, New York City.

Media
He is a judge on MasterChef Israel.

During the 10th MasterChef season in 2022, Shani was criticized after he discriminated against a contestant who lives in Bat Ayin based on his residence. Critics called for Shani's removal from the show.

Reception 
Shani's unique presentations, twists on famous dishes and street food, and colorful, even pretentious, language have drawn both praise and criticism. 

Writer Liel Leibovitz called Shani "Israel's most celebrated chef", and concluded that "Eyal Shani is a genius." Another critic claims he had one of the worst meals in his life at one of Shani's restaurants, saying "It feels like you're being scammed. He doesn't even deserve the title of 'Chef'. His mannerisms are only there to cover for bad cooking." New York Post's Steve Cuozzo noted that on a trip to Israel, many chefs he spoke to said Shani is "regarded as a joke" in his home country. 

While HaSalon enjoyed moderate popularity since opening, it drew criticism for its high prices.  Shauna Lyon from The New Yorker wrote "The prices are so high that you might find yourself straining to calculate the best deals." Cuozzo was also critical: "Many of the Mediterranean menu’s scandalously priced stinkers were just meh", and concluded "HaSalon translates as the salon or, as applied to this venue, the living room. But it might as well mean, Ha, suckers! The joke’s on us."

References

Israeli television chefs
1959 births

Living people